Ronald Gustave Kellett,  (13 September 1909 – 12 November 1998) was an English stockbroker who became a flying ace during the Second World War while serving in the Royal Air Force.

Early life
Kellett was born in Eldon, County Durham, on 13 September 1909 and educated at Rossall School. After school he worked as a postboy at the Liverpool Stock Exchange before moving to London when he was aged 18 to join the stockbroking firm of Laurence Keen and Gardner.

Royal Air Force
Kellett joined No. 600 Squadron Auxiliary Air Force in 1933. He was later to serve with No. 616 Squadron RAF.

During the Battle of Britain he flew with No. 249 Squadron RAF and commanded No. 303 Squadron RAF, the first operational Polish fighter squadron.  He was awarded the Virtuti Militari 5th Class by the Polish Government.

The following words about the Polish fighters were written in the 303 Squadron Chronicle by Kellett when he was leaving the unit: 

In December 1940 he formed 96 Squadron based at RAF Cranage, Cheshire to defend the port of Liverpool. Promotion followed and in March 1941 he went on to command the fighter wing at RAF North Weald. He was rested from operations at the end of 1942. With a tally of kills for the war at 5 confirmed 2 probable and 1 damaged, Kellett held the status of a flying ace.

He became a Member of Council for Training at the Air Ministry and in 1943 taught at the Turkish Air Force staff college at Ankara. He returned to the United Kingdom at the end of the war to be demobilised.

Later life
Kellett returned to his work in the London stock exchange with Laurence, Keen and Gardner where he remained until he retired, aged 64. He rejoined the Royal Auxiliary Air Force and commanded No. 615 Squadron RAF at RAF Biggin Hill. He relinquished his commission on 1 October 1953. From 1949 he farmed in Kent and enjoyed the country pursuits of hunting, shooting as well as sailing. From 1973 Kellet, along with his brother Alfred, planted a small vineyard to produce wine until it was destroyed in the storms of 1987.

Family life
Kellett had married Daphne in 1939 and they had two sons and three daughters. Kellet died in Kent 12 November 1998 aged 89, his wife Daphne died in 1994.

Honours and awards
1 October 1940 - Squadron Leader Ronald Gustave Kellett (90082) Auxiliary Air Force was awarded the Distinguished Flying Cross in recognition of gallantry display in flying operations against the enemy

25 October 1940 - Squadron Leader Ronald Gustave Kellett, DFC (90082) Auxiliary Air Force was appointed a Companion of the Distinguished Service Order in recognition of gallantry displayed in flying operations against the enemy.

December 1940 - Virtuti Militari 5th Class by the Polish Government

References

1909 births
1998 deaths
People from Bishop Auckland
Royal Air Force wing commanders
Companions of the Distinguished Service Order
Recipients of the Distinguished Flying Cross (United Kingdom)
Recipients of the Silver Cross of the Virtuti Militari
British World War II flying aces
Royal Air Force pilots of World War II
The Few
People educated at Rossall School
Britannia Trophy winners
English stockbrokers
20th-century English businesspeople